The 2019 IAAF World Indoor Tour was the fourth edition of the IAAF World Indoor Tour,  the highest series of international track and field indoor meetings. It was designed to create an IAAF Diamond League-style circuit for indoor track and field events, to raise the profile of indoor track and field athletics.

The Tour retains six events for 2019, five in Europe and one in the United States. All six 2018 meetings returned, although the order of the meetings has been rearranged from 2018, and the Birmingham Indoor Grand Prix has returned from Glasgow to Birmingham as part of a long term deal, having hosted the 2018 IAAF World Indoor Championships. Glasgow, in turn, will host the 2019 European Athletics Indoor Championships at the end of the indoor season, from 1–3 March 2019.

Meetings

Continuing the long term agreement alternating venues of the Great Britain leg, the Glasgow Grand Prix returns to Birmingham, England, accommodating in this case the holding of the 2019 European Athletics Indoor Championships in Glasgow, Scotland.

Scoring system
At each meeting a minimum of 12 events were staged. Included in the 12 events will be a core group of five or six events split across the two-season cycle.

Tour counting events for 2019 were the men’s 60m, hurdles 400m, 1500m, high jump and long jump, plus the women’s 60m, 800m, 3,000/5,000m, pole vault, triple jump and shot put.

Points were allocated to the best four athletes in each event, with the winner getting 10 points, the runner up receiving seven points, the third-placed finisher getting five points and the athlete in fourth receiving three points. There is a bonus 3 points awarded to any athlete who set a world record.

The individual overall winner of each event received US $20,000 in prize money. In each event the finishing positions offered the following money: 1st: $3000. 2nd: $1500. 3rd: $1000. 4th: $750. 5th: $500. 6th: $300. For middle distance races, $200 and $150 will be awarded to 7th and 8th place. All tour winners qualify for the 2020 IAAF World Indoor Championships, taking a wildcard spot subject to ratification by their country.

Indoor Tour Events

The following events are core Tour events for the 2019 indoor season:

Men

 400 metres
 1500 metres
 60 metre hurdles
 High jump
 Long jump

 Women

60 metres
800 metres
3000 metres
Pole vault
Triple jump
Shot put

Results

Men's track

Men's field

Women's track

Women's field

Final 2019 World Indoor Tour standings

Men

Women

References

World Athletics Indoor Tour
Indoor World Tour